Pappostipa is a genus of flowering plants belonging to the family Poaceae.

Its native range is Western and Southern Central USA to Northwestern Mexico, Peru to Southern South America.

Species:

Pappostipa ameghinoi 
Pappostipa arenicola 
Pappostipa atacamensis 
Pappostipa braun-blanquetii 
Pappostipa choconensis 
Pappostipa chrysophylla 
Pappostipa chubutensis 
Pappostipa colloncurensis 
Pappostipa frigida 
Pappostipa hieronymusii 
Pappostipa humilis 
Pappostipa ibarii 
Pappostipa jucunda 
Pappostipa kieslingii 
Pappostipa maeviae 
Pappostipa major 
Pappostipa malalhuensis 
Pappostipa mapuche 
Pappostipa marqueziana 
Pappostipa nana 
Pappostipa nicorae 
Pappostipa parodiana 
Pappostipa patagonica 
Pappostipa ruiz-lealii 
Pappostipa semperiana 
Pappostipa sorianoi 
Pappostipa speciosa 
Pappostipa vaginata 
Pappostipa vatroensis 
Pappostipa zulmae

References

Poaceae
Poaceae genera